Kamothe is a node of Navi Mumbai which is developed and maintained by CIDCO. Kamothe is located on the Sion Panvel Highway. It is the third node after Panvel and Kalamboli towards Mumbai.

Location 

The site of Kamothe adjoins the Central Business District of Belapur (CBD Belapur) of Navi Mumbai and is surrounded by Kharghar in its north, Taloja in north-east, Kalamboli in its east and Panvel in its south. The western region of Kamothe is a wet land area with enormous mangroves.

Characteristics 

Kamothe is divided into 48 Sectors. These sectors are evenly divided which makes this area more spacious . Kamothe has some great infrastructure facilities and it is growing fast as population in this area has grown as compared to 5 years back.

Transportation 

Kamothe falls in Raigad district and is maintained by the Panvel Municipal Corporation and CIDCO.

Kamothe has two railway stations Mansarovar and Khandeshwar that lie on the harbour line, a part of Mumbai suburban railways.

Auto rickshaws provide the primary means of personal local transportation.

BEST, NMMT and MSRTC/ST buses serve as another means of transportation over a long distance to various nodes through Navi Mumbai. Kamothe postal index number is 410209.

Schools and colleges 

 Loknete Ramsheth Thakur English Medium School and Jr. College 
 St. Agrasen High School & Jr. College
 Shankarrao Chavan Vidya English Medium School And Junior College
 Sushma Patil Vidyalaya and Junior College
 MNR School of Excellence - CBSE
 S.S.H. Jr. College
 H.B.P SHRI. DAMAJI GANPAT GOWARI VIDYALAYA & JUNIOR COLLEGE
 Shankar Rao Chauhan School & Jr. College
 Z.P.School
 Dattushet Patil School
 Loknete Ramsheth Thakur Public School - CBSE
 MGM School of Biomedical Sciences
 MGM Medical College and Hospital 
 M.U.M ENGLISH SCHOOL
 S S Bhagat New English School
 Indo Scots Global School
 Maji Amdar Dattusheth Patil Vidyalay
 New English School
 Kamothe Blasters Cricket Ground

References 

Nodes of Navi Mumbai
Cities and towns in Raigad district